James Brothers' House and Farm, also known as the Birthplace of Jesse James, is a historic home and farm complex located near Kearney, Clay County, Missouri. The original log section of the farmhouse was built about 1822; it was later enlarged with a wood-frame addition to form a "T"-plan dwelling.  The James Brothers' House is significant as the birthplace of Jesse James and Frank James and has been selected as the most important site related to the James Brothers in Missouri. In 1974 Clay County, Missouri, bought it. The county operates the site as a house museum and historic site.

It was listed on the National Register of Historic Places in 1972, with a boundary increase in 1978.

References

Historic house museums in Missouri
Houses on the National Register of Historic Places in Missouri
Houses completed in 1822
Museums in Clay County, Missouri
National Register of Historic Places in Clay County, Missouri